Susan Rogers is an American professor, sound engineer and record producer best known for being Prince’s staff engineer during his commercial peak (1983-1987), including albums like Purple Rain, Around the World in a Day, Parade, Sign o' the Times, and The Black Album." During this time she laid the foundations for Prince's now famous vault by beginning the process of collecting and cataloguing studio and live recordings. She has also worked as a sound engineer and record producer for several musical artists such as Barenaked Ladies (producing the 1998 album Stunt), David Byrne, Robben Ford, Jeff Black, Rusted Root, Tricky, Michael Penn, Toad the Wet Sprocket, and Tevin Campbell. She is an associate professor in the Music Production and Engineering and Liberal Arts departments at Berklee College of Music.

Career
Rogers was born on August 3, 1956, and grew up in Southern California and had an early interest in recorded music and in the 1970s moved to Hollywood. Her interest in working in a studio led her to work at the University of Sound Arts as a receptionist. She overheard a conversation about becoming a maintenance tech and decided to start studying electronics, acoustics and magnetism. This led her to apply for a job at Audio Industries, in 1978, and trained as a MCI console and tape-machine technician. She went on to become a maintenance tech for Rudy Records, Graham Nash and David Crosby’s studio, in 1981, where she got her first experience as an assistant engineer. Rogers moved to Minneapolis in 1983 to become Prince's technician. Her role quickly evolved into engineer despite only previously being an assistant engineer. As Paisley Park, Prince's recording studio, opened, Rogers left as his engineer and went on to have a 22-year career in the music industry.

In 2000 she decided to leave the music business and pursue an academic career. She earned her doctorate in music cognition and psychoacoustics in 2010 from McGill University.

Her book, This is What It Sounds Like: What the Music You Love Says About You, co-written with Ogi Ogas, was published by W. W. Norton in 2022 .

References

External links

1956 births
Living people
American audio engineers
Place of birth missing (living people)
Berklee College of Music faculty
McGill University School of Music alumni
Women audio engineers
Women music educators